Engen Botswana Limited is a downstream petroleum company. Engen's principal activity includes petrochemical investments and property operations. They market through a retail network.

Board of directors
The current board of directors includes:

 Dr S Ndzinge-Chairman
 AM Bryce
 C Monga-Managing Director
 A Siwawa
 F Kotze
 V Bvumbi
 R. Mathews
 C. Mareka

References

External links

 Company Website
 Botswana Stock Exchange
https://www.mmegi.bw/index.php?sid=4&aid=7&dir=2008/June/Thursday12/

Oil companies of Botswana
Companies listed on the Botswana Stock Exchange